Banner Township is a township in Dickinson County, Kansas, USA.  As of the 2000 census, its population was 148.

Banner Township was organized in 1877.

Geography
According to the USGS, it contains two cemeteries: College Hill and Mount Calvary.

The streams of East Turkey Creek, Middle Branch and West Turkey Creek run through this township.

Further reading

References

 USGS Geographic Names Information System (GNIS)

External links
 Dickinson County - Official Website
 City-Data.com
 Dickinson County Maps: Current, Historic, KDOT

Townships in Dickinson County, Kansas
Townships in Kansas